is a female Japanese TV presenter and news anchor.
She once served as an announcer for NHK and as one of the masters of ceremony for the annual Kohaku Uta Gassen.

External links
Mitsuyo Kusano Talent agent

Japanese television personalities
Tsuda University alumni
1967 births
Living people
People from Nakatsugawa, Gifu